District 11 can refer to:

District 11 (Ho Chi Minh city), Vietnam
District 11 (Zürich), Switzerland
 District 11, an electoral district of Malta
Colorado Springs School District 11, in Colorado Springs, Colorado, United States
District 11 (Hunger Games), fictional district in the Hunger Games books and films

See also
11th arrondissement (disambiguation)
District 10 (disambiguation)
District 12 (disambiguation)